A cockroach is a business that - from inception forward - grows gradually and progressively. It puts a specific emphasis on revenues as well as profits and ensures a tight cost control in order to make its growth especially robust as far as finances are concerned. Oftentimes these cockroaches are more resilient and thus considered a less risky investment than "unicorns".

References

Technology neologisms
2010s neologisms